This is a list of Chinese poems in the broad sense of referring to those poems which have been written in Chinese, translated from Chinese, authored by a Chinese poet, or which have a Chinese geographic origin. Chinese poems are poetry written, spoken, or chanted in the Chinese language. The various versions of Chinese include Classical Chinese, Standard Chinese and other historical and vernacular types. In other words, Chinese poetry refers to poetry written or spoken in the Chinese language. The various versions of Chinese poetry, as known historically and to the general knowledge of the modern world, include two primary types, Classical Chinese poetry and modern Chinese poetry.

List of Chinese poems (in Wikipedia)

This is a list of poems written in China, in Chinese, or by Chinese authors appearing in Wikipedia. The list is variously sortable by clicking on the radio buttons (up-and-down arrows/triangles) in the column-headers.

See also

General
Classical Chinese poetry
Chinese art
Shi (poetry) (the Chinese term for poetry)
Chinese literature
Chinese classic texts
List of national poetries
Modern Chinese poetry
:Category:Chinese translators

Poetry of particular (dynastic) periods
Han poetry
Jian'an poetry
Six Dynasties poetry
Tang poetry
Song poetry

Poetry works and collections
300 Tang poems
Classic of Poetry
Gao Bing
List of Chuci contents
List of Classical Chinese poetry anthologies
List of Three Hundred Tang Poems poets
"Li Sao"
New Songs from the Jade Terrace
Orchid Pavilion Gathering
Quantangshi
Sun Zhu
Wangchuan ji
Yan Yu (poetry theorist)

Individual poets, poems, and translators
List of Chinese language poets
Poetry of Cao Cao
Du Fu
Leung Ping-kwan
Li Bai
Poetry of Mao Zedong
Qu Yuan
Su Shi
Wang Wei
Xu Zhimo

Lists of poets
List of Chinese-language poets
List of Three Hundred Tang Poems poets

Important translators of Chinese poetry into English

Archie Barnes
Witter Bynner
Herbert Giles
David Hawkes
David Hinton
Bernard Karlgren
James Legge
Amy Lowell
Ezra Pound
Arthur Waley
Burton Watson

English-language translation collections
Sunflower Splendor: Three Thousand Years of Chinese Poetry

Poetic modes, genres, and forms
Ci (poetry)
Classical Chinese poetry forms
Classical Chinese poetry genres
Fu (poetry)
Jueju
Pailu
Qu (poetry)
Shi
Yuefu

Technical factors of poetry
Classical Chinese poetry
Classical Chinese poetry forms
Rime dictionary
Tone pattern
Rime table

Influence outside of China
Japanese poetry
Korean poetry
Vietnamese poetry
Ernest Fenellosa
Shigin Shiyin (詩吟)

Notes

Chinese
Chinese literature-related lists